The 1999 Ukrainian Cup Final is a football match that took place at the NSC Olimpiyskiy on 30 May 1999. The match was the 8th Ukrainian Cup Final and it was contested by Dynamo Kyiv and Karpaty Lviv. The 1999 Ukrainian Cup Final was the eighth to be held in the Ukrainian capital Kyiv. Dynamo won  by three goals.

Match details

References

External links 
 Calendar of Matches – Schedule of the 1997–98 Ukrainian Cup on the Ukrainian Soccer History web-site (ukrsoccerhistory.com). 
 Ukrainskyi futbol. 2 June 1999 (PDF, in Ukrainian)

Cup Final
Ukrainian Cup finals
Ukrainian Cup Final 1999
Ukrainian Cup Final 1999
Ukrainian Cup Final 1999